Khon Sang Chat (คนสร้างชาติ) or Run Khon Sang Chat (รุ่นคนสร้างชาติ) was the fourteenth album by Thai rock band Carabao. It was released in October 1994.

Track listing

References

1994 albums
Carabao (band) albums